The San Diego Padres are an American professional baseball team in Major League Baseball (MLB) based in San Diego, California. The club was founded in 1969 as part of the league's expansion. The team's hall of fame, created in 1999 to honor the club's 30th anniversary, recognizes players, coaches, and executives who have made key contributions to the franchise. Voting is conducted by a 35-member committee. Candidates typically must wait at least two years after retiring to be eligible for induction, though Tony Gwynn was selected during his final season in 2001 before the last game of the year. He was also the Hall of Fame's first ever unanimous selection. There are 17 members in the team's Hall of Fame, the most recent inductees being Larry Lucchino and Ted Leitner in 2022. The inductees are featured in an exhibit at the team's home stadium, Petco Park.

Cy Young Award winner Randy Jones, power-hitting first baseman Nate Colbert, and former owner Ray Kroc were elected to the founding class of the Padres Hall of Fame by a 24-panel committee that included 18 media members who had covered the Padres for at least seven years, four Padres representatives and one representative from the San Diego Baseball Historical Society and the Madres—a San Diego organization that promotes baseball. When Trevor Hoffman's induction was announced in 2014, Padres president Mike Dee stated that the hall's membership needed to be expanded "for those who may have not had [National Baseball] Hall of Fame careers like Trevor." Hoffman's induction was the first since manager Dick Williams' in 2009, as former club owners John Moores and Jeff Moorad had neglected the hall. New Padres ownership led by Ron Fowler placed a renewed organizational emphasis on the Hall of Fame, which included Hoffman's induction as well as future plans to relocate and redesign the hall's exhibit at Petco Park. 

The exhibit opened on July 1, 2016, at Padres Hall of Fame Plaza, which is located near the left field entrance of the park at the back of the Western Metal Supply Company building. The new facilities were part of the festivities for the 2016 MLB All-Star Game, which was hosted at Petco Park. The plaza is a tribute to not only the history of the major league club, but also the history of baseball in San Diego, including the Padres from the Pacific Coast League (PCL). On the same day the plaza opened, the Padres inducted San Diego native Ted Williams into their hall of fame. He played for the PCL Padres in 1936 and 1937, and is also a member of the National Baseball Hall of Fame. The Hall of Fame Plaza at Petco originally was to be named in honor of then-MLB commissioner Bud Selig, but the Padres reconsidered after negative reaction from the media and fans. Plans for the plaza also included eventual statues of Padres greats.

Inductees

See also

Breitbard Hall of Fame, San Diego sports hall of fame

References
General

Specific

External links

Padres Hall of Fame at padres.mlb.com

Awards established in 1999
Halls of fame in California
Major League Baseball museums and halls of fame
Hall of fame
1999 establishments in California